Suds or SUDS may refer to:

Common meanings
 Slang for beer
 Foam
 Colloquial name for soluble oil cutting fluid (British English)

Acronym
 Subjective units of distress scale, in psychology
 Sudden unexpected death syndrome, the sudden unexpected death of adolescents and adults during sleep
 Sustainable drainage system, an approach to urban water drainage system design
 Sydney University Dramatic Society

Film and television
 Suds (film), a 1920 silent film produced by and starring Mary Pickford
 "Suds" (SpongeBob SquarePants), an episode of season 1 of the animated television series SpongeBob SquarePants
 Suds McDuff, a fictional mascot in The Simpsons episode "Old Yeller-Belly"

People
 Suds Merrick (died 1884), New York river pirate
 nickname of Gene Fodge (1931–2010), American baseball pitcher
 nickname of Harvey Suds Sutherland (1894–1972), American Major League Baseball pitcher and outfielder

Other uses
 Sandusky Suds, a baseball team in the Ohio State League in 1887
 "Suds", a track on the 1966 James Brown album Mighty Instrumentals

See also
 Sud (disambiguation)
 
 

Lists of people by nickname